Bąk is a Polish-language surname. It is sometimes written as Bonk due to its pronunciation. In Polish, the word has several meanings, including Botaurus (a genus of birds in the heron family), horse-fly, child, and bumblebee. The surname may refer to:

 Arkadiusz Bąk (born 1974), Polish football player
 Bożena Bąk (born 1966), Polish badminton player
 Henryk Bąk (1923–1987), Polish actor 
 Jacek Bąk (born 1973), Polish football player
 Jakub Bąk (born 1993), Polish football player 
 Justyna Bąk (born 1974), Polish long-distance runner
 Krystian Bąk (born 1956), Polish field hockey player 
 Krzysztof Bąk (born 1982), Polish football player 
 Mateusz Bąk (born 1983), Polish football player
 Mirosław Bąk (born 1961), Polish footballer
 Thomas Bak, Polish-born German artist
 Hatice Bak, Turkish-born farmer

Polish-language surnames